Phi Kaps may refer to the following fraternities or their members:
 Phi Kappa Sigma
 Phi Kappa Theta